The following is a list of statewide initiatives and referendums modifying state law and proposing state constitutional amendments in Michigan, sorted by election.

1835-1899

1835

1850

1858

1860

1862

1866

1868

1870

1872

1874

1876

1878

1880

1881

1882

1884

1886

1887

1888

1889

1890

1891

1892

1893

1894

1895

1897

1898

1899

1900-1949

1900

1901

1902

1903

1904

1905

1906

1907

1908

1910

1911

1912

1913

1914

1915

1916

1917

1918

1919

1920

1921

1922

1923

1924

1926

1927

1928

1930

1931

1932

1934

1935

1936

1938

1939

1940

1941

1942

1943

1944

1945

1946

1948

1950-1999

1950

1951

1952

1954

1955

1956

1958

1959

1960

1961

1962

1963

1964

1966

1968

1970

1972

1974

1976

1978

1980

1981

1982

1984

1986

1988

1989

1992

1993

1994

1996

1998

2000-

2000

2002

2004

2006

2008

2010

2012

2014

2015

2018

2020

2022

See also 

 Government of Michigan

Notes

References

External links 

 Ballotpedia - Michigan Ballot Proposals

 
Ballot Proposals
Michigan